Filip Krajinović was the defending champion but chose not to defend his title.

Thomaz Bellucci won the title after defeating Íñigo Cervantes 6–1, 1–6, 6–3 in the final.

Seeds

Draw

Finals

Top half

Bottom half

References
 Main Draw
 Qualifying Draw

Sparkassen Open - Singles
2016 Singles